Coleophora mediterranea is a moth of the family Coleophoridae. It is found in Spain, France, Sardinia and Sicily.

The larvae feed on Atriplex littoralis. They feed on the generative organs of their host plant.

References

mediterranea
Moths described in 1990
Moths of Europe